Isaac Ashkenazi (born 1957 in Israel) is an Israeli Professor of Disaster Medicine at Ben-Gurion University of the Negev in Israel and a consultant to Harvard University. He is considered one of the world’s foremost experts in medical preparedness for complex emergencies and disasters.

Biography

Education and professional certification
 Doctor of Medicine, Hebrew University of Jerusalem, 1982
 License to practice ophthalmology, Israel Medical Association, 1992
 Master of Science in Ophthalmology, Tel-Aviv University, 1993
 Diploma in Medical Administration, Galilee College, 1996
 Master of Public Administration, John F. Kennedy School of Government, Harvard University, 2000
 Master of National Security, University of Haifa, 2006

Military service 
In 1982, Ashkenazi volunteered to the paratrooper forces in the IDF as a military doctor. After four years of intensive military training, treating wounded soldiers and working under fire, Ashkenazi started his residency in ophthalmology at Sheba Medical Center in 1986.

In 1993, Ashkenazi volunteered again for the IDF, this time as the Head of Medical Services in the West Bank. After one year of service, he was promoted to Head of the Public Health Department in the Israeli Medical Corps.

In 1997, he was promoted to full colonel with the responsibilities of Surgeon General for the Home Front Command (HFC) and the National Medical Coordinator for Mass Casualty Incidents and Disasters.

Disaster preparedness, and emergency response
Ashkenazi is Professor of Disaster Medicine at Ben-Gurion University of the Negev in Israel and a consultant to Harvard University, the Centers for Disease Control and Prevention, the United States Department of Health and Human Services, the United States Department of Homeland Security, and other national and international agencies.  Ashkenazi is the former head of the Medical Services and Supply Center for the Israeli Defense Forces (IDF) and served as the first Surgeon General for the IDF Home Front Command.

Ashkenazi is the Former Director of the Urban Terrorism Preparedness Project at the National Preparedness Leadership Initiative (NPLI), a joint program of the Harvard School of Public Health (HSPH) and the John F. Kennedy School of Government from July 2007 to April 2013.

Work 
He has given courses in Disaster Medicine; Disaster Management; Leadership during Crisis; Urban Terrorism and Preparation of Health Systems for Crisis. He has published more than two hundred papers in medical and scientific journals, and presented his work across North and South America, Africa, Europe Asia and the Middle-East. In the last twelve years, Ashkenazi has received Presidential Medals of Honor for Humanitarian Assistance from Turkey and Greece; the President of Rwanda; the Jewish Community in France, Turkey, Italy and USA; and the United Jewish Communities.

Working with his colleagues Leonard Marcus and Barry Dorn at the NPLI, Ashkenazi has been instrumental in the development of the concept and practice of meta-leadership and, specifically, its adoption by emergency response leaders.

Selected publications
 Marcus, L.J., Ashkenazi, I, Dorn, B., & Henderson, J. (2008). Meta-leadership: Expanding the scope and scale of public health. Leadership in Public Health, 8 (1&2), 2008.
 Ashkenazi, I. Predictable surprise—the 2008 Sichuan earthquake. Harefuah. 2008 Jul; 147(7):578-86, 664.
 Pinkert, M, Bloch, Y, Schwartz, D, Ashkenazi, I, Nakhleh, B, Massad, B, Peres, M, and Bar-Dayan, Y. (2007) Leadership as a component of crowd control in a hospital dealing with a mass-casualty incident: lessons learned from the October 2000 riots in Nazareth. Prehospital and Disaster Medicine. 2007 Nov-Dec; 22(6):522-6.
 Lerner EB, O'Connor RE, Schwartz R, Brinsfield K, Ashkenazi I, Degutis LC, Dionne JP, Hines S, Hunter S, O'Reilly G, Sattin RW. Blast-related injuries from terrorism: an international perspective. Prehospital Emergency Care. 2007 Apr-Jun; 11(2):137-53.
 Peltz R, Ashkenazi I, Schwartz D, Shushan O, Nakash G, Leiba A, Levi Y, Goldberg A, Bar-Dayan Y. Disaster healthcare system management and crisis intervention leadership in Thailand—lessons learned from the 2004 Tsunami disaster. Prehospital and Disaster Medicine. 2006 Sep-Oct; 21(5):299-302.
 Magnezi R, Dankner R, Shani M, Levy Y, Ashkenazi I, Reuveni H. Comparison of health care services for career soldiers throughout the world. Military Medicine. 2005 Dec; 170(12):995-8.
 Carasso S, Shmueli T, Arnon R, Ashkenazi I. Characteristics of emergency room admissions of IDF soldiers in northern Israeli hospitals between May 2002 and April 2003. Harefuah. 2004 Jan; 143(1):8-11, 88, 87.
 Gdalevich M, Ashkenazi I. Infection control in earthquake rescue team. Lancet. 30 October 1999; 354(9189):1564.
 Ashkenazi I. The disaster in Turkey—a personal account. Israel Medical Association Journal. 1999 Oct; 1(2):73-4.
 Katz J, Gdalevitz M, Ashkenazi I, Shemer J. Trends in the epidemiology of herpes simplex virus type 1 among the young adult population in Israel. Infection. 1999; 27(4-5):295-7.
 Mandel Y, Grotto I, Gdalevich M, Mimouni D, Ashkenazi I, Haviv J, Shpilberg O. Is the coexistence of mutations in the genes of factor V and MTHFR a predisposing factor for massive skin necrosis due to loxoscelism? Public Health Revue. 1998; 26(3):265-70.

For a more complete listing of publications: http://connects.catalyst.harvard.edu/PROFILES/ProfileDetails.aspx?From=Pinfo&Person=IA25

References

1957 births
Living people
Israeli emergency physicians
Israeli expatriates in the United States
Harvard University staff
Harvard Kennedy School alumni
The Hebrew University-Hadassah Medical School alumni
Tel Aviv University alumni